The Canadian University Rowing Association is the governing body for post-secondary rowing in Canada.  Its purpose is to promote participation in rowing through academic and sporting excellence at Canadian Universities.  The Canadian University Rowing Championship (CURC) is hosted annually in early November by one of the member institutions.  It is a showcase of top Canadian Under 23 and Senior rowing talent where many of the medalist and finalist athletes have represented or will go on to represent Canada internationally.

Championship Events
According to the CURA Playing Regulations, CURC events are the same for Men and Women and points are awarded to participating teams for 1st through 12th place in each event (current points system is displayed here, but points have been adjusted since the competition's founding in 1997):

Men's National Championships per School

Women's National Championships per School

National Champions
The Men's and Women's Teams with the most points are crowned National Champions and presented with the National Championship Banners following the regatta.

Awards
Each year following competition, the association presents a number of individual awards. Recipients are determined by a gathering of all head coaches present following the final race and handed out at the awards banquet later in the evening.

Female Athlete of the Year

Male Athlete of the Year

Women's Coach of the Year

Men's Coach of the Year

Trophies

As well as the trophies presented to the overall Men's and Women's teams with the most points, event trophies are presented to the winning crews in the Men's and Women's Eights events. All event trophies have been back dated to include previous winners of the event in question.

The Book of Honour: Men's Eight winners are presented with the Book of Honour, in which the names of all members of each year's winning Men's Eight are listed by hand in calligraphy on a new page along with a picture of the crew, winning time, etc. The Book of Honour was the first event award created and first presented before 2012 by members of past winning Men's Eights from numerous Canadian universities including Robert Weitemeyer (UBC), Peter McClelland (University of Western Ontario), and Adam Kreek (University of Victoria). The initials of the contributors are on an early page in the book itself.

The Jane Thornton Trophy: Women's Eight winners are presented with the Jane Thornton Trophy, which consists of a decorated wooden oar blade mounted on a beaver-chewed piece of driftwood set on a wooden base, on which a small wooden shield with the winning university's institutional coat of arms is placed. The trophy is named in honour of Jane Thornton, one of the most successful university rowers in the conference's history. The trophy was first presented in 2013. The trophy is constructed of a blade and oarlock from the Fredericton Rowing Club, where Thornton learned to row; similarly, the driftwood was taken from the Saint John River in Fredericton; the base was built by Thornton's father using local wood.

Results 2022

Results 2021

Results 2019

Results 2018

Results 2017

Results 2016

Results 2015

Results 2014

Results 2013

Results 2012

Results 2011

Results 2010

Results 2009

Results 2008

Results 2007

Results 2006

Results 2005

Results 2004

Results 2003

Results 2002

Results 2001

Results 2000

Results 1999

Results 1998

Results 1997

References 

University and college sports in Canada
Rowing governing bodies
Rowing in Canada
1997 establishments in Canada
Sports organizations established in 1997
Student sports governing bodies